Førre Church is a parish church of the Church of Norway in Tysvær Municipality in Rogaland county, Norway. It is located in the village of Førre. It is one of the two churches for the Førresfjorden parish which is part of the Haugaland prosti (deanery) in the Diocese of Stavanger. The white, wooden church was built in a long church style in 1893 using designs by the architect Tjerand T. Solheim. The church seats about 350 people. The church was consecrated on 19 September 1893.

See also
List of churches in Rogaland

References

Tysvær
Churches in Rogaland
Wooden churches in Norway
19th-century Church of Norway church buildings
Churches completed in 1893
1893 establishments in Norway